The Amminadav Formation is a Mesozoic geologic formation in Israel. Pterosaur fossils have been recovered from the formation.

See also

 List of pterosaur-bearing stratigraphic units

References

Geologic formations of Israel
Mesozoic Asia
Paleontology in Israel